The Norwegian folk music series is a scientific collection of traditional Norwegian dance music, divided into two separate series, a hardanger fiddle series, and a regular fiddle series. The Hardanger fiddle series is already published (Hardingfeleverket), and the fiddle series is in production. Together, the two series are meant to represent most, but not all, of Norwegian fiddle music as collected and written down.

The Hardanger fiddle series

The Hardanger fiddle books were published between 1958 and 1981. The editors were all traditional fiddlers who were well acquainted with the music in question. The three of them, Arne Bjørndal, Truls Ørpen and Eivind Groven, had all collected fiddle tunes in their areas, and were now asked to put their collections into print. As work progressed, Ørpen and Bjørndal both died, and Groven went on alone. Most of the practical edition was carried out by him.

The series consists of seven volumes, with some 2000 tunes all in all, from all the hardanger fiddle areas. The tunes are divided into families, based on musical relation.

The hardanger fiddle series has not been re-published, but is of great value for research on Norwegian dance music. In the US, folk music fans regard the books in the same way as the jazz real books. Most of the tunes are now available on the internet.

Norwegian culture